Word O.K. is an album by Kool A.D., released March 20, 2014. The album features guest appearances from Sir DZL, Ladybug "Santos Vieira" Mecca of Digable Planets, Toro Y Moi, Talib Kweli, Boots Riley of The Coup, Mr. Muthafuckin' eXquire.

Videos
Kool A.D. has stated that Word O.K. is a visual album, like Beyoncé's Beyoncé. The video for the song "Open Letter," directed by Nick Knight, who had previously directed Kanye West's "Bound 2" accompanied the release of the album. The videos for "Tight" and "I'm on a Plane" were released later that year on April 21, and May, 9, respectively. On May 28, Kool A.D. released the video to "Word," an animated video in which Kool A.D. imagines himself as a weed-smoking cartoon dog. Stereogum described the video, which Kool A.D. co-directed (along with Teddy O'Connor), as "hysterically perverse in that Fritz The Cat sort of way". Mother Jones magazine described the video as "a three-and-a-half minute, highly NSFW animated short that feels like an acid-fueled journey through a dystopian corporate carnival. It pans smoothly from Bart Simpson wearing a McDonald's tee and smoking a joint to a sexualized, anthropomorphized rabbit doing the same. Yin-yangs, peace signs, and other pop symbols breathe in and out of cartoon orifices." On June 9, 2014, Kool A.D. released the video for the title track, "Word O.K.", which was also directed by Nick Knight.

Critical reception

Word O.K. received generally positive reviews from critics. Consequence of Sound called it "more focused of an effort, featuring tighter, doubly succinct examples of Kool’s genre-leaping hijinks". CMJ praised the album, noting that "Kool A.D. hasn’t lost his dry sense of humor and ability to charmingly fit words into places they shouldn’t really fit." Robert Christgau named it the 9th best album of the year in his ballot for the Pazz & Jop critics poll.

Track listing

References

External links
 

2014 albums
Kool A.D. albums